The National Coalition is a coalition of opposition groups in the Syrian Civil War that was founded in Doha, Qatar, in November 2012.

National Coalition may also refer to:
In Finland, the National Coalition Party
In El Salvador, the National Coalition Party (El Salvador)
In Ireland, the Government of the 20th Dáil, a Fine Gael and Labour Party coalition government
In the Philippines, Koalisyong Pambansa (National Coalition)

See also
National Government (United Kingdom), sometimes referred to as the National Coalition